Weekend is a 1967 French postmodern black comedy film written and directed by Jean-Luc Godard and starring Mireille Darc and Jean Yanne, both of whom were mainstream French TV stars. Jean-Pierre Léaud, comic star of numerous French New Wave films including Truffaut's The 400 Blows and Godard's earlier Masculin Féminin, appeared in two roles. Raoul Coutard served as cinematographer; Weekend was his last collaboration with Godard for over a decade.

Plot summary 
Roland and Corinne Durand are a bourgeois couple. Each has a secret lover and conspires to murder the other. They drive out to Corinne's parents' home in the country to secure her inheritance from her dying father, resolving to resort to murder if necessary. The trip becomes a chaotically picaresque journey through a French countryside populated by bizarre characters and punctuated by violent car accidents. After their own Facel-Vega is destroyed in a collision, they wander through a series of vignettes involving class struggle and figures from literature and history, such as Louis Antoine de Saint-Just and Emily Brontë.

When Corinne and Roland eventually arrive at her parents' place, they discover that her father has died and her mother refuses to give them a share of the spoils. They kill her and hit the road again, only to fall into the hands of a group of hippie revolutionaries (calling themselves the Seine and Oise Liberation Front) that support themselves through theft and cannibalism. Killed during an escape attempt, Roland is chopped up and cooked.

Cast
 Mireille Darc as Corinne
 Jean Yanne as Roland
 Paul Gégauff as pianist
 Jean-Pierre Léaud as Saint-Just and man in phone booth
 Blandine Jeanson as Emily Brontë and page-turner for pianist
 Yves Afonso as Tom Thumb
 Jean-Pierre Kalfon as the leader of Front de Libération de la Seine et Oise
 Juliet Berto as a member of FLSO and a bourgeoise in a Triumph
 Jean Eustache as a hitchhiker
 László Szabó as an Arab garbage collector and revolutionary
 Omar Diop as an African garbage collector and revolutionary
 Anne Wiazemsky as an audience member in the piano recital
 Michel Cournot as an audience member in the piano recital

Themes and style 
Weekend has been compared to Alice in Wonderland, the James Bond series, and the works of Marquis de Sade. Tim Brayton described it as a "film that reads itself, tells the viewer what that reading should be, and at the same time tells the viewer that this reading is inaccurate and should be ignored."
In one of the first scenes Corinne tells her lover about a sexual experience she had. Part of the story she tells is based on the George Bataille novel Story of the eye (Histoire de l'œil).

Inspiration 
According to a letter from famous Argentine writer Julio Cortázar to his translator Suzanne Jill Levine, the indirect inspiration for the movie was Cortázar's short story La autopista del Sur ("The Southern Thruway"). Cortázar explained that while a British producer was considering filming his story, a third party had already presented the idea to Godard, who was unaware of its true source.

References

External links
 
 
 The Last Weekend an essay by Gary Indiana at the Criterion Collection

1967 films
1967 comedy-drama films
1960s French-language films
French avant-garde and experimental films
1960s dystopian films
French black comedy films
Films directed by Jean-Luc Godard
Films about cannibalism
Animal cruelty incidents in film
1960s road comedy-drama films
1960s black comedy films
French road comedy-drama films
Films based on works by Julio Cortázar
1960s French films